Eloy Matos is a Puerto Rican soccer player who plays for Don Bosco FC.

External links

1985 births
Sportspeople from San Juan, Puerto Rico
Puerto Rican footballers
Living people
Club Atlético River Plate Puerto Rico players
USL Championship players
Association football forwards
Puerto Rico international footballers